The events of 2004 in anime.

Accolades
At the Mainichi Film Awards, The Place Promised in Our Early Days won the Animation Film Award and Mind Game won the Ōfuji Noburō Award. Internationally, Ghost in the Shell 2: Innocence was nominated for the Annie Award for Best Animated Feature, the fourth consecutive year an anime was nominated for the award. Howl's Moving Castle was in competition for the Golden Lion at the 61st Venice International Film Festival.

Releases 
This list contains numerous notable entries of anime which debuted in 2004. It is not a complete list and represents popular works that debuted as TV, OVA and Movie releases. Web content, DVD specials, TV specials are not on this list.

Films 
A list of anime that debuted in theaters between January 1 and December 31, 2004.

Television series 
A list of anime television series that debuted between January 1 and December 31, 2004.

Original video animations 
A list of original video animations that debuted between January 1 and December 31, 2004.

See also
2004 in animation

External links 
Japanese animated works of the year, listed in the IMDb

Years in anime
2004 in animation
2004 in Japan